UNSW Hall is a residential college that is a part of University of New South Wales' student accommodation portfolio, founded in 2014.

History
At its founding, UNSW Hall occupied a facility built in 1959 that had temporarily occupied by Phillip Baxter College during a redevelopment of UNSW's Kensington Colleges. In 2018, this facility was identified by the university as end of life, threatening UNSW Hall with closure. Following the "Save UNSW Hall" campaign by residents against this, the college relocated to its current site on the north side of the University of New South Wales' Kensington campus in 2019.

Accommodation
UNSW Hall is a fully-catered facility, offering students three meals per day at the Goldstein dining hall during session. The accommodation has shared bathrooms and single rooms.

House Committee 
The House Committee is composed of student leaders elected annually by residents in various portfolios aimed at offering residents opportunities to be involved in extra-curricular activities. The House Committee includes an executive group of a president, secretary and treasurer and administers a budget each year across areas such as cultural, communities/charities, sport, social and communications.

References

Residential colleges of the University of New South Wales
Educational institutions established in 2014
2014 establishments in Australia